Williamsport City Hall, formerly the United States Post Office, is a historic building located at 245 West 4th Street between Government Place and West Street in Williamsport, Pennsylvania.  It was built between 1888 and 1891, and is a 2 1/2 to 3-story building, with a two-story addition and six-story tower. The exterior is faced with rough-faced gray limestone ashlar.  It was designed by the Office of the Supervising Architect under the direction of William A. Freret.

The building was added to the National Register of Historic Places in 1972 as a post office.

See also

Old City Hall (Williamsport, Pennsylvania)
National Register of Historic Places listings in Lycoming County, Pennsylvania

References

External links

Buildings and structures in Williamsport, Pennsylvania
Williamsport
Government buildings completed in 1891
National Register of Historic Places in Lycoming County, Pennsylvania